= Raymonds Fork, Virginia =

Unincorporated community in Virginia, United States

Coordinates: 38°04′36″N 77°19′30″W

Raymonds Fork is an unincorporated community in Caroline County, in the U.S. state of Virginia.
